The women's 500 meter at the 2017 KNSB Dutch Single Distance Championships took place in Heerenveen at the Thialf ice skating rink on Thursday 29 December 2016. Although this edition was held in 2016, it was part of the 2016–2017 speed skating season.

There were 20 participants. Beginning this season, there was just one run over 500m. There was a qualification selection incentive for the next following 2016–17 ISU Speed Skating World Cup tournaments.

Title holder was Margot Boer.

Overview

Result

Draw

Source:

References

Single Distance Championships
2017 Single Distance
World